= 9/16 =

9/16 may refer to:

- September 16, the 259th day of the year (260th in leap years) in the Gregorian calendar.
- Time signature, a notional convention used in Western musical notation.
